Harold Henry Blake  (1 August 1883 – 1960) was a British military commander and medical officer.

Blake was born in Great Yarmouth, with doctors on both sides of his family, and was educated at Framlingham College.  He graduated from the University of Durham and entered the Royal Army Medical Corps in 1908, going on to be a surgeon at the Cancer Hospital, Brompton.  During the First World War he served in France and Belgium. Between the wars, he served in East Asia, including periods in China and Hong Kong.

In 1943, Blake became the Superintendent of Stoke Mandeville Hospital, where he came into contact with the pioneering orthopaedic specialist Ludwig Guttmann.  Under their management, the treatment of patients with spinal injuries was revolutionised.

Major-General Blake appears as a character in the BBC's 2012 production, The Best of Men, played by Nicholas Jones.

References

1883 births
1960 deaths
British expatriates in China
British people in British Hong Kong
Officers of the Order of the British Empire
British Army personnel of World War I
People from Great Yarmouth
Royal Army Medical Corps officers
British Army major generals
British Army personnel of World War II
Alumni of Durham University College of Medicine